Play by Numbers is the second studio album by Australian rock and pop band Little Heroes. The album was released in August 1982 and peaked at number 37.

Reception
The T.V Scene Mag said "The Little Heroes are capable of provoking a blitting party mood at the twirl of a synthesiser knob" and said "the strategy is straight beat, bent words and slurred vocals" A Newspaper reviewer said "...all [the songs] seem to suffer from a deep loneliness, an alienation where all their actions are meaningless in the face of this isolation." adding "The elegane simplicity of the songs and their similarity tends to make the album pale after a while. Basically none of the songs are spectacular, but given the craftsmanship of Dave Marett's production  and Hart's voice, they are certainly appealing enough."

Track listing

Charts

References

Little Heroes (band) albums
EMI Records albums
1982 albums